Cell Journal is a quarterly peer-reviewed scientific journal covering molecular and cell biology. It was established in 1999 as Yakhteh Medical Journal, obtaining its current name in 2010. It is published by the Royan Institute and the editor-in-chief is Ahmad Hosseini (Shahid Beheshti University of Medical Sciences). According to the Journal Citation Reports, the journal has a 2021 impact factor of 3.128, ranking it 150th out of 203 journals in the category "Cell Biology".

References

External links

Publications established in 1999
English-language journals
Molecular and cellular biology journals
Quarterly journals
Academic journals published in Iran
Academic journals published by non-profit organizations